Dobrosav “Bob” Živković (born 7 May 1962) is a Serbian illustrator living in Belgrade.

Biography
Živković was born at in Pirot, then part of Yugoslavia. He graduated in 1987 at the Faculty of Applied Arts in Belgrade.

His works were acknowledged early during his studies, and were published in student magazines Student (1982) and 'Vidici ''(1982).

In early 1980s he worked as a science fiction and fantasy illustrator. His illustrations were published on the covers of novels of "Znak Sagite" imprint, science fiction and fantasy flmanac "Monolit" and magazine "Alef", later in Politikin Zabavnik.

His career shifted to artwork for children, in magazines "Tik-Tak" and "Zeka" (1987–1998). He created the children's comic strip Jajzi, that ran in "Tik-Tak". His true breakthrough came as he became a regular illustrator for "Politikin zabavnik".

In the late 1990s Živković was Art Director and premier illustrator of Saatchi & Saatchi offices in Serbia and Slovenia. He continues working in advertising business as well as a freelancer illustrator.

He is a promoter of environment awareness, children's rights, and often draws for humanitarian non-profits.

Most of his work in the last two decades was forCreative Centre publishing house (more than hundred books, translated into over 40 languages).

Selected works
 Cover of Serbian edition of Tolkien’s "Lord of the Rings" (Fellowship of the Ring, The Two Towers, Return of the King)
 Cover for Serbian edition of Stephen King’s "It"
 "National park Serbia", with Dragoljub Ljubičić
 "Sex for beginners", with Jasminka Petrović (sample)
 "School", with Jasminka Petrović (sample)
 Belgrade Zoo — "Good Hope Garden" campaign
 "Smart Book for Mum and Dad" for Serbian UNICEF (in Serbian and English)

Awards
 Three “Lazar Komarčić” awards for best science-fiction related artwork (1985, 1986. and 1988.)
 Five “Neven” awards for best illustrated children's book (given by “Prijatelji dece Srbije”, a children’s rights organisation)
 Two “Zlatno pero Beograda” Awards (an award given by ULUPUDUS, An Assosciaton of visual and applied artists and designers)
 Nominated for 2011 Hans Christian Andersen Award given by IBBY

References

External links
Creative centre publishing house
Znak Sagite magazine's page on Bob
 www.bobzivkovic.com - offline
 official Facebook page
 Bob's Wonderful Art on Tumblr

Serbian cartoonists
Serbian comics artists
Serbian comics writers
1962 births
Living people
People from Pirot